The Santa Clara Broncos football program was the intercollegiate American football team for Santa Clara University located in Santa Clara, California. Santa Clara played its first football game against St. Mary's College in San Francisco in 1896.

At the conclusion of the 1992 season, the Santa Clara football program was discontinued due to new NCAA regulations which mandated all sports be played at the same level at each university. Santa Clara had fielded all Division I teams with the exception of the Division II football team, and elected not to field a team at the Division I-AA level.

Santa Clara played in three major bowl games and won all three: 1937 Sugar Bowl, 1938 Sugar Bowl, and 1950 Orange Bowl.

Conference affiliations
1896–1952, 1959–1981, Independent
1973–81, Division II Independent
1982–91, Western Football Conference
1992, Division II Independent

Championships

Conference championships

Playoff appearances

NCAA Division II
The Broncos made one appearance in the NCAA Division II playoffs. They had a combined record of 1–1.

Bowl game appearances

AP Poll Rankings

1937 Final Poll No. 6
1938 Final Poll No. 9

College Football Hall of Fame

Quarterback, Nello "Flash" Falaschi led the Broncos to a 21–14 upset over LSU in the 1937 Sugar Bowl. Little Santa Clara was a decided underdog going against Louisiana State.

Buck Shaw's teams compiled a record of 47–10–4, including a span of 16 consecutive wins. The 1937 Santa Clara team allowed only nine points over a nine-game campaign. Highlighting Shaw's tenure at the Bronco helm were a pair of Sugar Bowl victories over heavily-favored Louisiana State, 21–14, in 1937, and 6–0, in 1938. 

Tom Fears was a two-way end who played for Santa Clara in 1941–1942. While with the 7–2  1942 Santa Clara Broncos football team, Fears helped Santa Clara defeat Utah and three Pacific Coast Conference schools in a row in Stanford, Cal and Oregon State. During that 1942 season Fears won All-Pacific Coast honors before joining the Air Force in World War II.

Leonard Casanova was a skilled Punter for Santa Clara in 1923. Standing on his own one-yard line, he punted a ball that went out of bounds on rival St. Mary's one yard line. Total distance, 98 yards. His career as head coach began in 1946 and covered four years at Santa Clara, one at Pittsburgh, 16 at Oregon. His 1949 Santa Clara Broncos football team team beat Bear Bryant's Kentucky in the 1950 Orange Bowl.

Brent Jones helped the Broncos to two Western Football Conference championships and was all-conference three times.

Pro Football Hall of Fame 

Born in Guadalajara, Mexico, Fears was the son of a Mexican mother, Carmen Valdés, and an American father, mining engineer Charles William Fears. Selected as a defensive back by the Los Angeles Rams in the eleventh round (103rd overall) of the 1945 NFL Draft, he is distinguished as being the first Mexican-born player to be drafted into the National Football League. Fears quickly made his mark as a wide receiver, while also displaying his versatility by playing on defense. During his first three seasons at the professional level, he led all NFL receivers in catches, and broke the league's single-season record with 77 catches in 1949.

Individual awards and honors

National awards

Amos Alonzo Stagg Award
Len Casanova (1990)

Bart Starr Award
Brent Jones (1998)

Division II Football Team of the Quarter Century (1975–2000)
Brent Jones

Conference awards

Western Football Conference Coach of the Year
Terry Malley (1985)

Western Football Conference Offensive Player of the Year
Brent Jones (1985)

All Americans

Francis "Hands" Slavich, DE- 1932 (INS-3rd Team)
Nello Falaschi, Quarterback- 1936 1st Team
 Phil Dougherty, G 1937 (INS-1st Team)
 Phil Dougherty, C 1937 (3rd Team)
Alvord Wolff, Tackle- 1937 3rd Team
Alvord Wolff, Tackle- 1938 Consensus 1st team
 John Schiechl, C- 1939 Consensus 1st Team
 Bill Anahu, DE- 1939 (INS-2nd Team)
Alyn Beals, DE- 1941 (NEA-3rd Team)
 Al Beals, DE- 1942 (CP-2nd Team) 
Jesse Freitas, QB- 1942 (AP-3rd Team)
 Vern Sterling, G- 1948 (AP-3rd Team)
 Vern Sterling, G 1949 3rd Team
 Vern Sterling, C 1949 (AP-3rd Team)
Dan Pastorini, Quarterback- 1970 1st/2nd Little All American
Brent Jones, TE/WR -1985 AP 1st Team

Notable alumni include
Bryan Barker
Dick Bassi
Alyn Beals
Mike Carey
Ken Casanega
Len Casanova
Steve Cisowski
Doug Cosbie
Pete Davis
Phil Dougherty
Nello Falaschi
Dan Farrell
Eddie Forrest
Jesse Freitas
Visco Grgich
Hall Haynes
Jerry Hennessy
John Hock
Gary Hoffman
Martin Jenkins
Brent Jones
Mike Kellogg
Pat Malley
Gern Nagler
Mike Nott
Dan Pastorini
John Schiechl
Alvord Wolff
Ellery Williams

References

 
American football teams established in 1896
American football teams disestablished in 1992
1896 establishments in California
1992 disestablishments in California